Austin Highsmith Garces, also credited as Austin Highsmith (born March 3, 1981), is an American actress, standup comic and writer.

Garces played Phoebe in Dolphin Tale as well as the sequel, and Garces later co-wrote a Lifetime film based on the series. She later wrote and co-starred in Harvest of the Heart.

In January 2023, she originated the role of Annie in Warren Leight's Home Front at Burbank's Victory Theater Center.

Garces is from Winston-Salem, North Carolina and was a 1999 graduate of Richard J. Reynolds High School.

References

External links

1981 births
American actors
Living people